The Uniklinikum Aachen, full German name Universitätsklinikum Aachen ("University Hospital Aachen", abbreviated UKA), formerly known as Neues Klinikum ("New Clinic"), is the university hospital of the city of Aachen, Germany. It is part of the RWTH Aachen and contains its whole medical faculty.

In addition to wards and common hospital facilities such as laundry and sterilization units, the Uniklinikum Aachen houses educational and research facilities including specialized clinics, theoretical and clinical institutes, lecture halls and training rooms.

The hospital's exterior has extensive visible pipes, which give the building an industrial appearance reminiscent of an oil refinery.

History 
In 1966 the RWTH Aachen school of medicine was founded.  At that time, the municipal hospitals in Aachen became university hospitals, but soon it was realized that they were too small.

In 1972 the construction of the Klinikum Aachen began, with a project of Aachen architects Weber & Brand.  Ten years later, the first rooms could be used by the faculty. The rest of the building was finished section by section. The construction was delayed because of problems with soft ground that could not support the whole building.

The official opening was celebrated in 1985.  Its original name was Neues Klinikum ("New Clinic") because there was already a hospital called Klinikum in Aachen at that time; the Klinikum does not exist anymore.

Facts and figures

References

External links 
 Universitätsklinikum Aachen

Hospital buildings completed in 1985
RWTH Aachen University
Buildings and structures in Aachen
Aachen
Hospitals established in 1985
High-tech architecture
1985 establishments in West Germany
Municipal hospitals
Medical and health organisations based in North Rhine-Westphalia